Equestrian at the 2004 Summer Paralympics at the Markopoulo Olympic Equestrian Centre was competed in the dressage discipline only. There were four grades of rider disability:
 Grade I - Mainly wheelchair users with poor trunk balance and or impairment of function in all four limbs, or no trunk balance and good upper limb function, or moderate trunk balance with severe impairment of all four limbs.
 Grade II - Mainly wheelchair users, or those with severe locomotor impairment involving the trunk and with good to mild upper limb function, or severe unilateral impairment.
 Grade III - Usually able to walk without support. Moderate unilateral impairment, or moderate impairment in four limbs, severe arm impairment. May need a wheelchair for longer distances or due to lack of stamina. Total loss of sight in both eyes, or intellectually impaired. Profile 36 riders were required to wear blacked out glasses or a blindfold.
 Grade IV - Impairment in one or two limbs, or some visual impairment.

Men and women competed together, and the horses were also declared medal winners.

Participating countries

Medal table

Medal summary

See also
Equestrian at the 2004 Summer Olympics

References

2004 Summer Paralympics events
2004
2004 in equestrian
Para Dressage